Paul Kendall Gibbons (born 25 June 1971 in New Plymouth, Taranaki) is a retired pole vaulter from New Zealand. He competed for his native country at the 1992 Summer Olympics, where he was eliminated in the qualifying round with no official mark. Gibbons set his personal best (5.51 metres) in 1992 and equalled it in 1997.

Personal bests

External links

IAAF Biography

1971 births
Living people
New Zealand male pole vaulters
Athletes (track and field) at the 1990 Commonwealth Games
Athletes (track and field) at the 1992 Summer Olympics
Olympic athletes of New Zealand
Commonwealth Games competitors for New Zealand